Limnaecia xylinella is a moth in the family Cosmopterigidae. It is found on Java.

References

Snellen, P. C. T. 1902. Beschrijvingen van nieuwe exotische Tortricinen, Tineinen en Pterophorinen benevens aanteekeningen over reeds bekend gemaakte soorten. - Tijdschrift voor Entomologie 44 (1901):67–98, p.90–91; pl. 6, fig.5.
Natural History Museum Lepidoptera generic names catalog

Limnaecia
Moths described in 1901
Moths of Indonesia